Trans-Gomti area is an important sub-city in the Lucknow city with its population slightly less than the old city. It is relatively more developed than the mainland due to the contemporary planning. It is divided into the following areas:
 Mahanagar
 Vikas Nagar
 Nirala Nagar
 Aliganj
 Janakipuram
 Indira Nagar
 Chinhat
 Gomti Nagar

Demographics
With the population of slightly more than one million it is the most literate area in the entire Uttar Pradesh state. It mostly has middle class professionals and is more cosmopolitan than the main city.

Economy
It constitutes the central business area of Eastern Uttar Pradesh with many BPOs, R&D centres, IT, and ITES centres. It also has the Indira Gandhi Pratishthan which is the largest science and technology centre in Uttar Pradesh. Most of the economic activity happens in Indira Nagar-Gomti Nagar and Sitapur Road while rest of the area is used for residential purpose.

The institutional area in Vibhuti Khand, a locality in Gomti Nagar, is fast developing as the second Central Business District of Lucknow.

Education
Educational institutions include:

Indian Institute of Management
Institute of Engineering and Technology 
Babu Banarasi Das University
Lucknow University
Colvin Taluqdars' College
Central School
City Montessori School
Delhi Public School
CIMAP
St Dominic Savio College

Neighbourhoods in Lucknow